The Fife Coastal Path is a Scottish long distance footpath that runs from Kincardine to Newburgh along the coastline of Fife. The path was created in 2002, originally running from North Queensferry to Tayport. It was extended in 2011 with a new section running from Kincardine to North Queensferry, then again in 2012 from Tayport to Newburgh. The Fife Coastal Path is managed and maintained by Fife Coast and Countryside Trust, a registered environmental charity, and is designated as one of Scotland's Great Trails by NatureScot. About 500,000 people use the path every year, of whom about 35,000 walk the entire route.

Places of Interest
Places of historic interest along the route include Aberdour Castle, Macduff's Castle near East Wemyss, Wemyss Castle, and Pitmilly, a former estate associated with the Moneypenny family. On the southern bank of the river Tay between the historic rail bridge, scene of one of the greatest rail disasters in Britain and the 1960s road bridge, lies the historic town of Newport. Here you will pass the ferry terminal built by Telford, before passing the historic posting house building (built 1806), which now houses the Tatha gallery, named after the Gaelic for the River Tay. Along the way a range of diverse wildlife such as porpoises, dolphins and puffins may also be seen. The focal point of the Fife Coastal Path is the Harbourmaster's House, in Dysart, which was used as a location during the filming of Outlander. The building now houses a visitor centre and cafe, as well as being the head offices of the Fife Coast and Countryside Trust.

The path includes a short (c. 0.5 km) optional section known as the Elie Chain Walk, between Kincraig Point and Earlsferry to the west of Elie. This route, which should only be used during low tides, has chains fixed to the cliffs and rocks of the shore to assist progress, and is sometimes referred to as Scotland’s secret via ferrata. At times, short vertical climbs are necessary, although most of the chains are positioned to provide support while walking. The chains were first installed in the 1920s, and were replaced in 2010. An alternative, more straightforward route runs along the clifftop above.

Carlin Knowes quarry, North Queensferry has a memorial plaque commemorating the halting of the victims of the 1850 Irish Evictions from Dunfermline by quarrymen deputised by the Provost of Inverkeithing.

Running
On 5 October 2013, a team of 6 runners from Carnethy Hill Running Club in Edinburgh set a mark of 15 hours and 10 minutes running continuously in stages along the 187-km length, starting at Kincardine at 3am and finishing in Newburgh at 6.10pm. This mark has subsequently been ratified by the Fife Coast and Countryside Trust.

On the evening of Friday 4th September 2020, at 11.12pm, Carnethy Hill Racing Club member, Nicola Duncan, (Edinburgh based but originally from Galway, Ireland) set off from Kincardine to run the route, finishing at Newburgh 23 hours, 16 minutes, 54 seconds later on the evening of Saturday 5th September to set the FKT (Fastest Known Time) for a solo runner to complete the entire Fife Coastal Path.

Towns and villages on the path
Listed from south to north (anti-clockwise):

 Kincardine
 Culross
 Valleyfield
 Torryburn
 Charlestown
 Limekilns
 Rosyth
 North Queensferry
 Inverkeithing
 Dalgety Bay
 Aberdour
 Burntisland
 Kinghorn
 Kirkcaldy
 Dysart
 West Wemyss
 East Wemyss
 Buckhaven
 Methil
 Leven
 Lundin Links
 Lower Largo
 Elie and Earlsferry
 St Monans
 Pittenweem
 Anstruther
 Cellardyke
 Crail
 Kingsbarns
 Boarhills
 St Andrews
 Guardbridge
 Leuchars
 Tayport
 Newport-on-Tay
 Woodhaven
 Wormit
 Balmerino
 Newburgh

Approximate map

See also
 Scotland's Great Trails
 Fife Pilgrim Way
 List of places in Fife

References

External links

Fife Coast and Countryside Trust
Official Fife Coastal Path Web Site
Fife Coastal Path guidebook
Fife Coastal Path description and mapping on Walkhighlands

Scotland's Great Trails
Geography of Fife
Tourist attractions in Fife
Coastal paths in Scotland